José Antonio "Toño" Rada Angulo (13 June 1937 – 1 June 2014) was a Colombian footballer.

International career
He played two matches for the Colombia national football team at the 1962 FIFA World Cup, which was held in Chile. In that tournament he played an important role in the match between his team and the USSR where he scored a goal and passed the ball for another. The final score was 4–4 and it was the first point for Colombia in a World Cup.

References

1937 births
2014 deaths
Colombian footballers
Colombia international footballers
1962 FIFA World Cup players
Association football midfielders
People from Atlántico Department